Robert Cheeke is an American bodybuilder, motivational speaker, and author. He is a vegan activist and spends his time touring the United States for speaking engagements and book promotions. He also runs a fitness site, Vegan Bodybuilding and Fitness, and serves as an endorser for Sequel Naturals as well as their National Event Coordinator for the United States.

Cheeke is the co-founder of C-VEG, a Corvallis-based Vegan group, a former Board Member for non-profit groups OrganicAthlete and Northwest VEG in Portland, and the founder and president of Vegan Bodybuilding & Fitness.

Biography

Early life
Cheeke grew up on a farm, and cites his positive childhood experiences interacting with the farm's animals as the source of compassion that would later lead him to embrace veganism. At age 15, Cheeke made the transition to veganism and began organizing animal rights events at Corvallis High School including the initiation of recycling programs and providing vegan meals to those in need with Food Not Bombs.

Career
Cheeke began his athletic career as a cross country runner for Oregon State University in 1999 but soon developed an interest in weight lifting and strength training. He became a competitive bodybuilder the following year in 2000. Five years later, in 2005 Cheeke won the title of INBA Northwestern USA Natural Bodybuilding Overall Novice Champion. In the following years he competed in the Natural Bodybuilding World Championships in 2006, and the Northwestern USA Natural Bodybuilding Championships in 2009 (where he took first place in his class).

In 2006 he released Vegan Fitness: Built Naturally, a documentary about himself and two other vegan athletes, Brendan Brazier and Tonya Kay. He was voted one of VegNews magazine's "15 most influential vegan athletes". Cheeke has appeared in radio interviews.

Personal life
Cheeke endorses Vega Foods supplements and has been featured in news articles including a feature in the Willamette Week and magazines like Organic Lifestyle Magazine.

Bodybuilding titles
 2005 INBA Northwestern USA Natural Bodybuilding Overall Novice Championship

Competitive placings
 2006 Natural Bodybuilding World Championships
 2009 Northwestern USA Natural Bodybuilding Championships - 1st in class

DVDs
 Robert Cheeke – Vegan Fitness: Built Naturally (2006)
 Robert Cheeke - Vegan Brothers in Iron (2010)

Books
 The Plant-Based Athlete: A Game-Changing Approach to Peak Performance (2021) with Matt Frazier.  Premiered at #4 on the New York Times Bestseller list. 
 Plant-Based Muscle (2017)
 Shred it (2014)
 Vegan Bodybuilding & Fitness – The Complete Guide to Building Your Body on a Plant Based Diet (2010)

See also
List of vegans

References

External links

 
 Weightlifting Equipments
 Yoga Equipment

American bodybuilders
American veganism activists
Corvallis High School (Oregon) alumni
Living people
Oregon State University alumni
Sportspeople from Corvallis, Oregon
Year of birth missing (living people)